Strode's Mill Historic District is a national historic district located in East Bradford Township, Chester County, Pennsylvania. It encompasses 11 contributing buildings in the crossroads community of Strode's Mill. They are dated between about 1721 and 1880.  It includes the separately listed Strode's Mill and East Bradford Boarding School for Boys, Strode Farm, millers house, Strode's Pork Products plant, blacksmith / tenant house, blacksmith / wheelwright shop, and tenant house.

It was added to the National Register of Historic Places in 1989.

References

Historic districts on the National Register of Historic Places in Pennsylvania
Historic districts in Chester County, Pennsylvania
National Register of Historic Places in Chester County, Pennsylvania
Blacksmith shops